Peregrine Bertie, 2nd Duke of Ancaster and Kesteven  (29 April 16861 January 1742), styled The Honourable Peregrine Bertie between 1686 and 1704, Lord Willoughby de Eresby between 1704 and 1715 and Marquess of Lindsey between 1715 and 1723, was a British politician who sat in the House of Commons from 1708 until 1715 when he was called to the House of Lords.

Early life
Bertie was the second and eldest surviving son of Robert Bertie, Lord Willoughby de Eresby (subsequently 4th Earl of Lindsey) and his first wife Mary Wynn, daughter of Sir Richard Wynn, 4th Baronet. He became Lord Willoughby and heir to other titles on the death of his elder brother in 1704.

Career
At the 1708 British general election Lord Willoughby was returned as a Member of Parliament for Lincolnshire with his father's support. Although his father was a Whig, Willoughby acted as a Tory. He sat on a drafting committee for the Boston church bill, and a committee of inquiry into the laws excluding placemen. He acted against the Whigs in an electoral dispute. Although nominated to the committee examining the arrangements for the trial of Dr Sacheverell, he voted against the impeachment in 1710. He was returned as a Tory at the 1710 election and listed as one of the 'worthy patriots' who detected the mismanagements of the previous administration, and a 'Tory patriot' who opposed the continuation of the war in 1711. He was also a member of the October Club. He sat on drafting committees for bills to build a waterworks near Boston and to help drain the Ancholme Level. As a Hanoverian Tory, he voted against the expulsion of Richard Steele in March 1714. He did not stand at the 1715 general election but was summoned to the House of Lords by a writ of acceleration in his father's Barony of Willoughby de Eresby on 16 March 1715.

Lord Willougby married Jane Brownlow, daughter of Sir John Brownlow, 3rd Baronet in June 1711. He was a Gentleman of the Bedchamber to George I from 1719 to 1727. In 1723, on the death of his father, he inherited the rest of the family titles, and the hereditary Great Office of Lord Great Chamberlain. He also inherited the Lincolnshire seats at Grimsthorpe Castle and Eresby. He was appointed Lord Lieutenant of Lincolnshire in succession to his father in 1724. He was receiver of the Duchy of Lancaster rents in Lincolnshire from 1728 to his death, and Lord Warden and Chief Justice in Eyre north of the Trent from 1734 to his death. He had a seat on the Foundling Hospital's board of governors when the charity was founded in 1739.

Ancaster's wife died on 25 August 1736. He died on 1 January 1742, having had seven children:
Peregrine Bertie, 3rd Duke of Ancaster and Kesteven (1714–1778)
Lord Albemarle Bertie (died 16 May 1765), blinded early in his youth, a gambler and sportsman depicted by Hogarth
Brownlow Bertie, 5th Duke of Ancaster and Kesteven (1729–1809)
Lady Mary Bertie (died 23 May 1774), married on 21 February 1747 Samuel Greatheed
Lady Albinia Bertie (died 12 February 1754), married in 1744 Francis Beckford, no issue
Lady Jane Bertie (died 21 August 1793), married on 31 March 1743 General Edward Mathew and had issue
Lady Caroline Bertie (died 4 June 1744), married George Dewar

References

1686 births
1742 deaths
Alumni of the University of Oxford
Peregrine
18
102
Lord Great Chamberlains
Lord-Lieutenants of Lincolnshire
Members of the Privy Council of Great Britain
Willoughby de Eresby, Peregrine Bertie, Lord
British MPs 1708–1710
British MPs 1710–1713
British MPs 1713–1715
Freemasons of the Premier Grand Lodge of England